Blue Yonder (formerly JDA Software Group) is an American software and consultancy company owned by multinational conglomerate Panasonic. Blue Yonder provides supply chain management, manufacturing planning, retail planning, store operations and category management offerings headquartered in Scottsdale, Arizona. The company has more than 3,000 corporate customers in the manufacturing, distribution, transportation, retail and services industries. Companies acquired over time include Yantriks, Blue Yonder, RedPrairie, i2 Technologies, Manugistics, E3, Intactix, and Arthur.

History  
In 1985, James Donald Armstrong and Frederick M. Pakis formed the US-based JDA Software, Inc. in Cleveland, Ohio. After signing a contract with a Phoenix-based automotive retailer in 1987, all eight JDA employees relocated to headquarters in Arizona. After 10 years of operation as a privately held firm, JDA went public on March 15, 1996.

In 2006, JDA acquired Manugistics Group Inc., a Rockville, MD developer and provider of supply chain management solutions for over $200 million.

On November 5, 2009, JDA announced its intent to acquire i2 Technologies, a Dallas-based provider of supply chain management software. The acquisition was completed in January 2010. In June 2010, Dillard's Department Stores won a $246 million judgment against i2, claiming damages from use of two supply chain management systems. JDA announced efforts to reduce or reverse this judgment, noting Dillard's still used the software and had done so since 2000.  The case was settled in 2011.

On August 8, 2016, JDA was reported to be exploring its sale to Honeywell International Inc. The sale was challenged on August 16, 2016 by The Blackstone Group, giving an alternative to JDA by offering a financing plan.

On January 30, 2017, Girish Rishi succeeded Bal Dail as CEO.

On July 2, 2018, JDA announced an agreement to acquire Blue Yonder GmbH. The acquisition was completed on August 7, 2018.

On February 11, 2020, JDA announced that it was renaming itself to Blue Yonder, Inc. On July 23, Blue Yonder announced the acquisition of Yantriks.

On April 21, 2021, Panasonic announced that it had agreed to acquire Blue Yonder. The acquisition was closed on September 17, 2021.

In February 2022, CEO Rishi stepped down. In July 2022, Duncan Angove was announced as the new CEO.

As of 2022, Blue Yonder has filed for IPO.

References 

1985 establishments in Ohio
American companies established in 1985
Companies based in Scottsdale, Arizona
Software companies established in 1985
Software companies based in Arizona
Software companies of the United States
Supply chain software companies
1996 initial public offerings
Companies formerly listed on the Nasdaq
Panasonic
American subsidiaries of foreign companies
2016 mergers and acquisitions
2021 mergers and acquisitions